"Find Out Why" is a single by the British punk rock and progressive rock group Inspiral Carpets. It was released in August 1989 and contains the 16-minute epic "Plane Crash" as a B-side. In 1990, it was re-released in the US as the Cool as Fuck EP, with the tracks "Joe" and "Out of Time" as bonus songs. The EP used a modified version of the artwork for the single, with the art a different shade of green and the title and logo overlaid.

In 1990, the track was rewritten as the theme tune to The 8:15 from Manchester.

B-sides
The 7" version does not contain the B-side "Plane Crash". The track was recorded live to 2 inch tape in one take.

According to the liner notes track of the Keep the Circle compilation, "Plane Crash" was intended to be as long as the master tape would allow. The original song is said to have run an hour long. The spoken line "We've got ten minutes" by Tom Hingley at the 10:06 mark of the track is said to have been in response to someone asking what time it was. The abrupt cut-out at the end of the song is due to the tape running out.

Track listing

References 

1989 singles
British punk rock songs
1989 songs
Inspiral Carpets songs
UK Independent Singles Chart number-one singles